Lambula bilineata is a moth of the family Erebidae. It was described by George Thomas Bethune-Baker in 1904. It is widely distributed in New Guinea following the Central Mountain Range and other high mountain ridges.

References

Lithosiina
Moths described in 1904